Barnabe mey refer to:

 Barnabe Creek, a stream in the U.S. state of California

People

Given name
 Barnabe Barnes (1609), English poet
 Barnabe Googe (1540–1594), poet and translator
 Barnabe Jolicoeur (born 1966), former Mauritian sprinter
 Barnabe Rich (1617), English author and soldier
 Barnabe (artist) French painter

Surname
 Bruno Barnabe (1905–1998), English film and stage actor
 Charlie Barnabe (1900–1977), pitcher in Major League Baseball
 Heather Barnabe, CEO of G(irls)20
 Jean Barnabe (born 1949), former Congolese cyclist

See also
 Barnabé (disambiguation)
 Barnaby (disambiguation)